Vishnudham Mandir is a temple on the border of the village Bherwania & Sadiha and Bhervania, Siwan District, Bihar, India, where a statue of Lord Vishnu was found by a carpenter underneath a tree in 1998. The temple was constructed in South Indian architecture by local villagers and authorities, at the site of the statue.
It is the largest idol of Lord Vishnu in north India made up of black granite and measuring 7.5 feet long and 3.5 feet in width. The idol belongs to the Gupta period. The idol has four arms carrying a "sankh(conch)", a "chakra(discus)", a "gada (club)", and a "padma (lotus)". There are two figures – one masculine and another feminine – below the left and right arms of the idol. An idol of goddess Laxmi was also recovered from the spot but it was stolen.

References

Hindu temples in Bihar